George Douglas Hawley (April 3, 1841 – September 22, 1934) was an Ontario politician. He represented Lennox in the Legislative Assembly of Ontario from 1879 to 1883 and in 1886 as a Liberal member.

He was born in Fredericksburg Township, Lennox County, Upper Canada in 1841, the son of Joseph Case Hawley, and educated in Kingston. Hawley married Sarah Caroline Bristol, the daughter of doctor Amos Samuel Bristol. He defeated Alexander Hall Roe in the 1879 election, lost to Roe in 1883 and then was elected to the same seat in an 1886 by-election held after Roe's death. He was defeated in the general election that followed later that year. In 1887, Hawley was named clerk for the division court at Napanee; in 1895, he was named sheriff for Lennox and Addington Counties.

External links 

The Canadian parliamentary companion and annual register, 1881, CH Mackintosh
History of the County of Lennox and Addington, WS Herrington (1913)

1841 births
1934 deaths
Ontario Liberal Party MPPs